The FIL European Luge Natural Track Championships 1987 took place in Jesenice, Yugoslavia.

Men's singles

Women's singles

Men's doubles

Medal table

References
Men's doubles natural track European champions
Men's singles natural track European champions
Women's singles natural track European champions

FIL European Luge Natural Track Championships
1987 in luge
1987 in Yugoslav sport
Luge in Slovenia
International sports competitions hosted by Yugoslavia